Qaracheh (also Romanized as Qarācheh) is a village in Barrud Rural District, Kuhsorkh County, Razavi Khorasan Province, Iran. At the 2006 census, its population was 590, in 180 families.

References 

Populated places in Kuhsorkh County